

The Preiss RHJ-8 is a homebuilt side-by-side two-seat flapped glider. It is an evolution of the Preiss RHJ-7, which was developed from a Schreder HP-14. First flown in 1970. The wingspan was slightly increased and the empennage was changed to a T-configuration, with the stabilator mounted atop the vertical stabilizer. The undercarriage is partially retractable (modified by some builders to be fully retractable) and the large canopy swings open to the rear.

Specifications

References
An RJH-8 owner's page
sailplanedirectory.com

1970s United States sailplanes
Glider aircraft
Aircraft first flown in 1970